The International Simón Bolívar Prize serves to recognise activities of outstanding merit that, in accordance with the ideals of Latin American independence hero Simón Bolívar, "contribute to the freedom, independence and dignity of peoples and to the strengthening of a new international economic, social and cultural order".

The Prize is awarded by the United Nations Educational, Scientific and Cultural Organization (UNESCO) every second year, on 24 July (the anniversary of Bolívar's birth). In addition to the intrinsic distinction bestowed on recipients, the award comes with a sum of money (currently USD $25,000), determined and donated by the government of Venezuela.

Prize winners are selected by the unanimous decision a jury of seven "eminent persons" – five representing the regions of the world, one chosen by the Venezuelan authorities, and a representative of the director-general – from a list of candidates submitted by UNESCO member states and associate members. Both individuals and institutions are eligible as candidates.

Laureates
The following persons and organisations have been recognised by the International Simón Bolívar Prize since the scheme's inception in 1983:

References

UNESCO awards